The 2011 Final Resolution  was a professional wrestling pay-per-view event produced by the Total Nonstop Action Wrestling (TNA) promotion, which took place on December 11, 2011 at the Impact Wrestling Zone in Orlando, Florida. It was the eighth event under the Final Resolution chronology.

In October 2017, with the launch of the Global Wrestling Network, the event became available to stream on demand.

Storylines

Final Resolution featured eight professional wrestling matches that involved different wrestlers from pre-existing scripted feuds and storylines. Wrestlers portrayed villains, heroes, or less distinguishable characters in the scripted events that built tension and culminated in a wrestling match or series of matches.

Results

References

External links
Final Resolution at In Demand.com
Impact Wrestling.com

Final Resolution
2011 in professional wrestling in Florida
Professional wrestling shows in Orlando, Florida
December 2011 events in the United States
2011 Total Nonstop Action Wrestling pay-per-view events